Colorado Millennial Site is a prehistoric Paleo-Indian archaeological site located near Ruxton in the southeastern part of the U.S. state of Colorado, sitting along the border between Baca and Las Animas counties.  It is also known by its site ID, 5LA1115, and the names Hackberry Springs and Bloody Springs.

The site was inhabited from 6999 B.C. to A.D. 1900.  The prehistoric cultures included Archaic and Woodland cultures and the site is significant for its rock art, village settlement, and military battle site.

The site, situated along an overhanging bluff, provided natural shelter and had access to a reliable supply of water for its prehistoric inhabitants, who left evidence of their residency in the form of rock art.

The Cheyenne and U.S. 7th Cavalry had the last documented southeastern Colorado military battle with Native Americans at the site in 1868.

See also
 List of prehistoric sites in Colorado
 Prehistory of Colorado

References

Paleo-Indian archaeological sites in Colorado
Archaeological sites on the National Register of Historic Places in Colorado
Baca County, Colorado
Las Animas County, Colorado
Plains Woodland period
Rock shelters in the United States
Historic districts on the National Register of Historic Places in Colorado
National Register of Historic Places in Las Animas County, Colorado